Caille is a commune in the Alpes-Maritimes department in southeastern France.

Geography
Caille is built on a rocky outcrop in a glacial peneplain. Near to Bauroux, one of the major summits of the Alps, the village is surrounded by coniferous forests. Caille is constructed on an East-West axis along a single main street, which leads to the village of Andon, six kilometres away.
Caille was a fundamentally agrarian town and although the population of farmers has halved in the last 30 years, cereal crops, sheep and cattle are still farmed there today by two families.
Recently, there has been a drive towards tourism and the village features gîtes, mountain biking courses, an adventure playground, a ski slope and a gallery exhibiting local artists.

History
Caille takes its name from the Indo-European root word Cal, meaning a place overlooking a rock. Caille is also the French word for quail, and the local church, rectory and town hall all feature carvings of quails.
Although there was a human presence in the Caille region in antiquity, it was not until the late 15th century that the name of Caille is mentioned in official documents as Calha. Two large families were recorded in the region; 'De Castellane' (of Castellane) and 'Brun de Castellane' (Brown of Castellane). From the 17th to 18th century, the ruling family of Caille were 'Théas'. In January 1790, the National Constituent Assembly created the department of Caille, which included the 11 cantons of Séranon. On 6 November 1801, when the number of Cantons was reduced, it was included in the canton of St. Auban.

Population

See also
 Communes of the Alpes-Maritimes department

References

External links

 Official site (In French)

Communes of Alpes-Maritimes